The C.A. Schnack Jewelry Co. Store in Alexandria, Louisiana was listed on the National Register of Historic Places in 2000.

It was designed by architect Herman J. Duncan and built by contractors Tudor and Ratcliff.  It is a two-story brick party-wall commercial building with a three-story wing at the back.  Its facade has "a handsome multi-arched transom, richly ornamented canopy, and intricately worked display windows."

References

Commercial buildings on the National Register of Historic Places in Louisiana
Neoclassical architecture in Louisiana
Commercial buildings completed in 1931
Buildings and structures in Alexandria, Louisiana
National Register of Historic Places in Rapides Parish, Louisiana